This is a list of recording artists who have reached number one on the singles chart in Italy since Federazione Industria Musicale Italiana (FIMI) began reporting charts on 4 January 1997.

All acts are listed alphabetically.
Solo artists are alphabetized by last name, Groups by group name excluding "A", "An", and "The".
Each act's total of number-one singles is shown after their name.
All artists who are mentioned in song credits are listed here; this includes one-time pairings of otherwise solo artists and those appearing as featured. Members of a group who reached number one are excluded, unless they hit number one as a solo artist.

0–9
112 (1)
2 Eivissa (1)
2Pac (1)
II Volo (1)
883 (1)

A
Gigi D'Alessio (1)
Adele (5)
Aerosmith (1)
Alessandra Amoroso (3)
Alexandra Stan (1)
Alexia (3)
Alizée (1)
All Saints (1)
Tori Amos (1)
Anastacia (3)
 Anastasio (1)
Anggun (1)
 Anna (2)
Aqua (3)
Arisa (3)
Artisti Uniti per l'Abruzzo (1)
Asaf Avidan (1)
Aventura (1)
Avicii (1)

B
Backstreet Boys (2) 
Band Aid 20 (1)
Baby K (1)
Claudio Baglioni (1)
 Bastard Sons of Dioniso (1)
J Balvin (5)
Daniele Battaglia (1)
Lou Bega (1)
 Benji & Fede (1)
Orietta Berti (1) 
Beyoncé (1)
Justin Bieber (3)
Bizarrap (2)
Black Eyed Peas (3)
 Blackwood (1)
Blanco (4)
Mary J. Blige (1)
Bloodhoundgang (1)
 Bloody Vinyl (1)
Blue (1)
Bomfunk MC's (1)
Boomdabash (1)
Bon Jovi (1)
Carl Brave (1)
Michele Bravi (1)
 Bresh and Shune (1)
Descemer Bueno (1)
 Brenda (1)
Michael Bublé (1)
 Luca Butera (1)

C
The Calling (1)
Camila Cabello (1)
Pedro Capó (1)
 Cara (1)
Mariah Carey (1)
Pierdavide Carone (1)
Marco Carta (2)
 Charlie Charles (2)
Chiara (2)
Cher (1)
Chumbawamba (1)
 Cinema 2 (1)
Clean Bandit (1)
Club Dogo (2)
Coez (3)
Colapesce (1)
Coldplay (1)
Coolio (1)

D
Daft Punk (2)
 Dardust (1)
Dark Polo Gang (3)
Deborah Iurato (1)
Miggy Dela Rosa (1)
Depeche Mode (3)
Des'ree (1)
Dido (2)
Dimartino (1)
Luca Dirisio (1)
Diodato (1)
Celine Dion (1)
DJ Dado (1)
DJ Snake (1)
Drake (1)
Dr. Dre (1)
 Drefgold (2)

E
Eamon (1)
Sfera Ebbasta (24)
 Tony Effe (1)
Eiffel 65 (2)
El Cata (1)
Elisa (4)
Elio e le Storie Tese (1)
Elodie (1)
Eminem (3)
Ernia (1)
Evanescence (1)
Faith Evans (1)

F
Farruko (1)
Dani Faiv and Tha Supreme (1)
Fedez (12)
Giusy Ferreri (5)
Tiziano Ferro (5)
Fabri Fibra (2)
Five (1)
Luis Fonsi (1)
Zucchero Fornaciari (1)
Lorenzo Fragola (1)
Freshlyground (1)
Fugees (1)

G
Francesco Gabbani (1)
Maria Gadú (1)
Lady Gaga (1)
Gala (2)
Gente De Zona (1)
Gemitaiz (2)
 Geolier (2)
Ghali (5)
Maître Gims (1)
Giò Di Tonno (1)
Giorgia (2)
Giuliano Sangiorgi (1)
Selena Gomez (1)
Goo Goo Dolls (1)
Gotye (1)
Ellie Goulding (2)
Gorillaz (1)
Green Day (1)
David Guetta (1)

H
Haiducii (1)
Geri Halliwell (1)
Hoobastank (1)
Hozier (1)
Rocco Hunt (1)
James Hype (1)

I

Enrique Iglesias (2)
Irama (1)

J
Janet Jackson (1)
J-Ax (5)
Michael Jackson (7)
Nicky Jam (2)
Jamelia (1)
Jamiroquai (2)
 Simone Jay (1)
Wyclef Jean (1)
Jon Bon Jovi
Livin' Joy (1)
Vegas Jones (1)
Jovanotti (6)
Juanes (1)

K

 Junior K (1)
Ronan Keating (1)
Nicole Kidman (1)
Kiesza (1)
Kimbra (1)
Sean Kingston (1)
Wiz Khalifa (2)
Emis Killa (1)
Klingande (1)
Lenny Kravitz (1)

L
Las Ketchup (1)
 Achille Lauro (1)
Avril Lavigne (1)
 Lazza (7)
 Luchè (1)
Le Vibrazioni (1)
Levante (1)
Ligabue (4)
Lilly Wood & The Prick (1)
Gusttavo Lima (1)
Lollipop (1)
Jennifer Lopez (4)
Lorde (1)
Lo Stato Sociale (1)
Lukas Graham (1)
Lucenzo (1)
Lumidee (1)
Lunapop (1)
Lykke Li (1)
L.V. (1)

M
MØ (1)
 Mace (1)
 Machette (2)
Madonna (12)
Madman (2)
Mahmood (3)
Major Lazer (1)
Måneskin (2)
Fiorella Mannoia (1)
Manu Chao (1)
Marracash (2)
Lene Marlin (2)
Emma Marrone (4)
Ricky Martin (3)
Maroon 5 (1)
Mattafix (1)
Ana Mena (2)
Shawn Mendes (1)
Paolo Meneguzzi (1)
Marco Mengoni (5)
George Michael (3)
Francesca Michielin (4)
Mika (2)
Robert Miles (3)
Kylie Minogue (2)
Modà (1)
Fabrizio Moro (1)
Mousse T (1)

N
Gianna Nannini (1)
Nathalie (1)
Naughty Boy (1)
 Maria Nayer (1) 
Negramaro (1)
Neja (1)
Anne-Marie (1)
Noemi (2)
Noir Desir (1)
Novecento (1)
 Nstasia (1)

O
Oasis (5)
The Offspring (1)
Mr. Oizo (1)
Omi (1)
OneRepublic (1)
Don Omar (1)

P
Fred De Palma (1)
Panjabi MC (1)
Sean Paul (2)
Passenger (1)
Laura Pausini (4)
Paola & Chiara (1)
Guè Pequeno (5)
Katy Perry (1)
 Pulcino Pio (1)
Pinguini Tattici Nucleari (2)
Pink (1)
Pitbull (1)
Piero Pelù (2)
Capo Plaza (6)
Elvis Presley (1)
Psy (1)
Lola Ponce (1)
Povia (1)
Charlie Puth (2)
Puff Daddy (1)

Q

Quavo (1)
Quevedo (1)

R

Raf (1)
Ralphi Rosario (1)
Eros Ramazzotti (6)
Dizzee Rascal (1)
Red Hot Chili Peppers (1)
Regina (1)
Francesco Renga (2)
 Rhove (1)
Rihanna (2)
Rkomi (2)
Valeria Rossi (1)
Vasco Rossi (9)
Fabio Rovazzi (2)
Kelly Rowland (1)
Lee Ryan (1)
Nate Ruess (1)
Rvssian (1)

S
Salmo (9)
Sam Smith (1)
Sangiovanni (1)
 Mara Sattei (3)
Valerio Scanu (2)
Robin Schulz (1)
 Shablo (1)
Shakira (6)
Ed Sheeran (3)
 Shiva (4)
 Sick Luke (1)
Shivaree (1)
Sia (1)
 Slait (1)
Smoke City (1)
Snow (1)
Álvaro Soler (2)
 Stash (1)
Britney Spears (4)
Spice Girls (1)
Stromae (1)
Sugarfree (1)

T

T-Pain (1)
t.A.T.u. (1)
Takagi & Ketra (2)
Take That (1)
Tananai (1)
Michel Teló (1)
Tha Supreme (8)
Thegiornalisti (1)
Justin Timberlake (1)
Timbaland (2)
Tina Turner (1)
Ti.Pi.Cal. (2)
Tiromancino (1)
Tones and I (1)
Tricarico (1)

U
U2 (8)
 Ultimo (1)
Underworld (1)
 Urban Strangers (1)
Midge Ure (1)

W
Alan Walker (1)
 Michelle Weeks (1)
Whirlpool Productions (1) 
Will.I.Am (1)
Willy William (1)
Pharrell Williams (2)
Robbie Williams (5)

X
X Factor Finalisti 2009 (1)

Y

Daddy Yankee (2)

Z
Checco Zalone (1)
Zero Assoluto (2)
Renato Zero (2)

References
Hit Parade Archive
ItalianCharts.com — Archives from 2000 onwards

Italian Singles Chart